Hanna Ester Lundkvist  (born 17 July 2002) is a Swedish professional footballer who plays as a defender for Atlético Madrid and the Sweden national team. She has previously played for AIK and Hammarby.

Club career 
Hanna Lundkvist's parent club is Djurö-Vindö IF. She then played for AIK. On 2 June 2018, Lundkvist made her debut and scored a goal in Elitettan against Kvarnsveden.

Before the 2019 Elitettan season, Lundkvist and her teammate Felicia Saving joined Hammarby. A major reason for joining was the conditions for her development, including the coaching team, the players and competition for places, as well as the facility. During the 2019 and 2020 Elitettan seasons, she played all 52 league matches and helped the club get promoted to the Damallsvenskan, leading to her signing a two-year contract extension in December 2020. She made her debut in the top division in April 2021.

In December 2021, Lundkvist joined Spanish Primera División club Atlético Madrid, signing a two-and-a-half year contract. In January 2022, she made her debut against Villarreal, coming on as a substitute to replace Carmen Menayo.

National career

Junior
In November 2020, Lundkvist was called up to Sweden's national under-23 squad for the first time for a camp including an unofficial friendly against Kopparbergs/Göteborg, but withdrew before it started. In September 2021, she was called up for a friendly match against Netherlands, in which she made her debut at the under-23 level.

Senior
In November 2022, Lundkvist was called up to the Swedish senior national team for a friendly match against Australia. In February 2023, Lundkvist made her senior national debut, playing 76 minutes for Sweden in a friendly match against China in Marbella.

Personal life 
Lundkvist grew up on Djurö, an island in the Stockholm Archipelago.

References

External links 
 

2002 births
Living people
People from Värmdö Municipality
Sportspeople from Stockholm County
Swedish women's footballers
AIK Fotboll (women) players
Hammarby Fotboll (women) players
Elitettan players
Damallsvenskan players
Atlético Madrid Femenino players
Swedish expatriate women's footballers
Swedish expatriate sportspeople in Spain
Expatriate women's footballers in Spain
Primera División (women) players
Women's association football forwards
Sweden women's youth international footballers
Sweden women's international footballers